is a Japanese actress and former gravure idol.

Career

Television
She made her acting debut in 1992 in the TBS drama Obenkyō. In 1994, she was chosen Fuji Television Visual Queen. Two years later, Hinagata received the Golden Arrow Graph prize. In 1997 she was awarded a Special Prize at the 10th annual Japan Glasses Best Dressed Awards. She appeared on the Fuji TV program Iron Chef as a judge in "Battle Banana". Hinagata has appeared in at least 25 television roles, including the Fuji Television production Ring.

Film
Hinagata had the assignment of playing herself in a voice role in Crayon Shin-chan: Great Adventure in Henderland. She also appeared in a Gokudō no Onna-tachi film, and in the 2004 Ghost Shout.

Radio
Additionally, she has hosted five radio programs. She regularly appears on television variety shows, and has acted on stage. In commercials, she has represented Nissin Foods' ramen and udon, Mitsubishi (now Nippon) Oil, Asahi Soft Drinks' Sawayaka Budō, Pola Cosmetics, and Japan Tobacco's Yamucha-rō beverages. She has released five photo books and published two collections of essays.

Personal life
In May 1998, Hinagata married with commercial director Kazuma Yamamoto. After she gave birth to her daughter on May 11, 2000, she was able to balance between work and parenting with the help of her fellow mothers. They divorced on November 28, 2003.

In 2013, she remarried with actor Kousei Amano.

Filmography

Films
Crayon Shin-chan: Great Adventure in Henderland (1996), herself (voice)
Akumu-chan (2014), Noriko Higuchi
Nomitori Samurai (2018)

Television
Akumu-chan (2012), Noriko Higuchi
Hana Moyu (2014), Ikumatsu

References

External links
Hinagata Akiko at Suns Entertainment
Akiko Hinagata blog
Hinagata Akiko at TV Drama Database

1978 births
Living people
Japanese actresses
Japanese gravure idols
Japanese television personalities